Walking Man is the fifth studio album by singer-songwriter James Taylor. Released in June 1974, it was not as successful as his previous efforts, reaching only No. 13 on the Billboard Album Chart and selling 300,000 copies in the United States. Until 2008's Covers, it was Taylor's only studio album not to receive a gold or platinum certification from the RIAA.

The title track reached number 26 on the Easy Listening chart in October 1974.

Record World called the title track a "tall, proud mansong" that could be Taylor's biggest hit since "Fire and Rain."

Cash Box said of the single "Let It All Fall Down" that it's a "tender, highly lyrical tune, very reminiscent of the artist's powerful beginning.."  Record World called it a "nihilistic hymn of anarchy [that] gets the hauntingly up musical treatment."

"Hello Old Friend" was used in the intro for ABC's Game 3 coverage of the 1989 World Series, just before the pre-game broadcast was interrupted by a 6.9 magnitude earthquake.

Track listing
All tracks are written by James Taylor except where noted.

Side one
"Walking Man" – 3:30
"Rock 'n' Roll Is Music Now" – 3:25
"Let It All Fall Down" – 3:30
"Me and My Guitar" – 3:30
"Daddy's Baby" – 2:37

Side two
"Ain't No Song" (Joey Levine, David Spinozza) – 3:28
"Hello Old Friend" – 2:45
"Migration" – 3:14
"The Promised Land" (Chuck Berry) – 4:03
"Fading Away" – 3:32

Personnel
 James Taylor – lead vocals, backing vocals (1-4, 6), acoustic guitar (1-8, 10), arrangements
 David Spinozza – electric guitar (1, 4, 6, 7, 9, 10), acoustic electric guitar (1), electric piano (2), acoustic guitar (4), organ (8), arrangements
 Hugh McCracken – electric guitar (2, 3, 6, 9, 10), harmonica (4), acoustic guitar (8)
 Kenny Ascher – electric piano (1, 3, 6), acoustic piano (2, 7, 8, 10), organ (9)
 Don Grolnick – acoustic piano (4, 9), organ (4, 10), Vox humana (5, 8)
 Ralph Schuckett – clavinet (6), electric piano (7)
 Andy Muson – bass guitar (1-4, 6-10)
 Rick Marotta – drums (1-4, 6-10), backing vocals (2)
 Ralph MacDonald – percussion (1, 3, 4, 6, 8)
 Gene Orloff – strings (1, 4, 7), concertmaster (1, 4, 7)
 George Young – alto saxophone (2, 6, 7, 9)
 Kenny Berger – baritone saxophone (2, 6, 9)
 Michael Brecker – tenor saxophone (2, 6, 9)
 Barry Rogers – trombone (2, 6, 9)
 Randy Brecker – trumpet (2, 7)
 Alan Rubin – trumpet (2, 4, 6, 7, 9)
 Howard Johnson – tuba (2, 6, 9)
 Peter Gordon – French horn (4, 7)
 George Marge – oboe (4, 7)
 Linda McCartney – backing vocals (2, 3)
 Paul McCartney – backing vocals (2, 3)
 Carly Simon – backing vocals (2-6)
 Peter Asher – backing vocals (4, 6)

Production 
 Producer – David Spinozza
 Engineered and Mixed by Harry Maslin 
 Assistant Engineers – Blaise Castellano and David Henson
 Design – Rod Dyer
 Photography – Richard Avedon

Charts

References

1974 albums
Albums produced by David Spinozza
James Taylor albums
Warner Records albums